Ethel Lang may refer to:

 Ethel Lang (actress), (1902-1995) Australian actress
 Ethel Lang (supercentenarian) (1900-2015)  British supercentenarian